Oddville, MTV was an American variety television series starring Rich Brown. The series premiered June 16, 1997, on MTV.

History
Oddville, MTV was based on the New York City public-access television cable TV series Beyond Vaudeville that Rich Brown hosted from 1987 to 1996. Like before, the background puppets and Joey the Dancing Monkey appear again, with Joey having an updated look and only showing up during the musical segments without being called to the stage.

Cast
Rich Brown as host Frank Hope
David Greene as silent co-host David
Melissa Gabriel as the announcer
John Walsh as Joey the Dancing Monkey

As an example of a guest star, Ian McGrady made an appearance throwing grapes high into the studio ceiling and catching them in his mouth, consistently.  This was after an appearance by a so-called "human carpet", who read a manifesto of why he needed to be vacuumed and then summarily stretched out on the ground and was vacuumed by an assistant.

Reception
Phil Gallo of Variety described the show as "'stupid human tricks' on methamphetamines as one act after another is whisked to the floor to perform before hitting the couch for a few questions". Gallo went on to describe Hope as having "an Everyman quality possessed by TV hosts from [Joe] Franklin to Uncle Floyd to Colin Malone", and said that announcer Gabriel has "a warm and enchanting presence".

Episodes
1) Stephen Baldwin, Haley the Human Bowling Ball, Jimmy Del Rio, The Fiery Diana Kiefer, Danny the Wonderpony, Fred Rooty Toot Doot, Orbit

2) Doug E. Doug, The Fan-Tastic Jason Gerb, Fruity Nutcake, Microman Sean Boggs, Leonard "Old Mother Hubbard" Sragow, The Amazing Feets of Jaki, Los Straitjackets

3) Kellie Shanygne Williams, The Footloose Adam Rothman, Izzy Fertel, Human Abacus Bob Yang, Mail Vocalist Stryker, Asaari's Doggie Doings, OMC

4) Andy Dick, Drag King Dred, James Delise Tongue Tricks, Funnyman Neil Connie Wallace, Human Piggybank Josh Weisbrot, Belcher Laura Vichroski, Jill Sobule

5) Kendall Gill, Kamchik the Singing Cowboy, Pauly's Marshmallow Mania, Pretzel Girl Leslie Liebling, Coco & Penny, Young Yeller Ken Tufo, Chavez

6) Eric Schaeffer, Richard Bush & His Stomach of Steel, Interpretive Dancer Suzanne Muldowney, Closed Mouth Kimberly Conlon, Moses Josiah & His Musical Saw, Ten Cents-ation Rob DeFalco, Tonic

7) Michael Michele, Escape Artist Da 7 Devine, The Seasoned Swingers, Burp Master Ryan McCormick, Funnyman Jackie Jayson Exit, Suzanne the Dolphin Girl, Hanson

8) Kenny Anderson, Sayed the Whirling Dervish, Toe-rific Cheryl Romero, Nosy Jim Grosso & His Sister Louise, Body Beautiful Tucker Farrar, Chad the Velociraptor, BR5-49

9) Kevin Smith, Joey Lauren Adams, The Legendary Benny Bell, Tattooed Dancer Clare Ann Matz, Human Pincushion Eric Ziobrowski, Th Amazing Steve and Alex Max, Courtney the Seagull Girl, King Chango

10) Donald Faison, Human Electro Beatbox Masai Green, Mr. Freddie Sez, Bendable Ashley Doran, Daredevil Ron Star, Louis The Levitator Somma, Robert Bradley's Blackwater Surprise

11) Joe Barbara, Balloonists Stephanie & Keith, Arthur of New York, Pretzel Boy Samuel Greenfeld, Radio-active Steven Scott, Raven's Fowl Play, K's Choice

12) Frank Whaley, Painproof Rubber Girls, Florence Miller Dancers, Belcher Bryan Kelly, Bicep Soloist Paul Shields, Contortionist Kristen Kellog, The Lemonheads

13) Taylor Negron, Lightbulb Eater Chris Allison, Rabbi Henry Katz, One-Hand Clapper Jason Rossi, Gloria and Babydoll Gibson, Head Banger Rafael McDonald, Cibo Matto

14) Darrell Hammond, Animal Cracker Expert William Peregine, Sci-Fi Siren Roberta Rogow, Handwrestler Nassim Ajami, Pied Piper Herb Bloom, Cat noises by James Cayo, The Cunninghams

15) Matt Pinfield, Sticky students Chris & Shane & Jen & Tom, Shepard and Jourdan, Grape Catcher Ian McGrady, Eugene the Human Doormat, Reservoir Rob Esris, Big Ass Truck

16) Jerry O'Connell, Jon Murray and His Chris Walken Arms, Nicole Pinto and her accordion, Keith Conrade Smokes out Ear, Arthur Grundig & Maria, Ashley Curtis the human car alarm, Bloodhound Gang

17) Rider Strong, Mr. Phil & Son, Bettina the Ugly Face, Gregg Goldin's Write Stuff, Hangin with Brett Burton, Stacy's Tip Top Tap, Sloan

18) Alan Cumming, Wonder Women Erinna & Hedre, Mark Clemente and the Magical Tongue, Fredi Dundee and Angus, Wayne Ooh La La Lammers, The Knee-dy Justin Priolo, Subborn All-Stars

19) Adam Wylie, Dancer Julio Diaz, Joanna Iron Jaw Leban, Bingo Gazingo, Cubist Abe Mittleman, Barker Marigo, Jon Spencer Blues Explosion

20) Joe Pantoliano, Condom Head Dan Lipper, Balladeer BJ Snowden, Andrew Fleming and His Musical Teeth, Funnyman Neil Connie Wallace, Facial Seemstress Maria Evangelatos, Komeda

21) Dave Attell, Feminist Izzy Fertel, Moses Josiah & His Musical Saw, Rigid Reiko, Up and Combing Eleana Reynoso, Blastmaster Drew, Papas Fritas

22) Kurt Loder, Tattooed Tunesmith Clyde Forsman, Nostril Thrills with Demetrious, Judy's Bear Feat, Baby Sharen, Pint-sized Eli Rarey, The Toasters

23) Sheryl Lee Ralph, Horny Drum Tribe, Red Mascara, Katie's Write Face, Naughty Annie Berman, Thu Le, Sugar Ray

24) Peta Wilson, Grant Stiles and his Bee Beard, The Psychic World of Cassandra, Jabberjaw Sean Hanzok, Powerful Pete Traina, Tim's Monkey Business, Fun Lovin' Criminals

25) Georgianna Robertson, Ripplin' Rob Aloi, Dr. Sue Horowitz, The Unfiltered Adam Rothman, Human Playground Dave Ladson, Sonya the Seagull Girl, Ween

26) Victoria Silvstedt, Greg's World of Sound, Doctor McGougain, Blading Beauty Judy Meyers, Nut Expert Elizabeth Tashjian, The Disarming Emily Harder, Skeleton Key

27) Mary Lynn Rajskub, Prince Cortes of the Philippines, Akim of the Lotus Collective, The Striking Nayeem Mian Siddique, Human Zoo Emren Alev, Lickin' Lukic, Madder Rose

28) Rhonda Ross Kendrick, Cow Belle Natalia Paruz, The Sole-Full Leigh Foster, Chairman Steve, John Johnson & Axe Capoeira, Ab-solutely Mario Bruno, Vibrolush

29) Scott Bairstow, Maurice Catarcio the World's Strongest Grandpa, Tara DeLong the Closed-Mouth Singer, Jimmy Del Rio, The A-Peel-ing Michael Schleigh, Rollins Band

30) Shaun Baker, Miss Rhea Roma, Bubbly Rhonda Farmer, Micah's Belly Laffs, Fruity Nutcake, Squeaky Thomas Mancusi, Claw Hammer

31) Dom Irrera, The Uncanny Nisan Banin, Azza & Sira & Monica & Shahira, The Comic Stylings of Gary Allen, Reversible Dave Shaffer, Coward

32) Jocelyn Seagrave, Wally the Pig, The Legendary Benny Bell, Danglin' Steve Belledin, Eunjin Hwang, Tapehead Olivia Ward, Reel Big Fish

33) Rhonda Shear, The Swell Zenon Pimentel, Gloria & Baby Doll Gibson, Jugglin' Josh Weiner, Matt Fogelman, Gene's Pool, Thin Lizard Dawn

34) Jessica Biel, Coin Operator Jaymes Hodges, Dachsund Friendship Club, Bend Over Ben Binford, Andy's Chicken Delight, Holey Lori Sapp, That Dog

35) Nick Turturro, Shakin' Ollie Shasta, Wiry Yana Toyber, The Ass-tounding Peter Russo, Flipping Out with James, Auslender the Rib Bender, MxPx

36) Chris Spencer, B. J. Snowden, Muscleman Maurice Catarcio, Adnilem Gnitzel, Jason's Effervescence, Pulsars

37) Kenan Thompson & Kel Mitchell, Izzy Fertel, Michael Mahoney Uncaged, Alan's Hand-Jive, Anne's Heads and Tales, Arc de Ronit, Frogs

38) Viewer email, Mr. Spoons, Jessie Flo & Willie Sue The Busers, Star Spangled Struttin' with Paul Amerika, Naughty Annie Berman, Human Bagpipe Lucas Crane, Daniel Cartier

39) Stacy Ferguson & Renee Sandstrom & Stefanie Ridel, Human Clothesline Jeremy Graham, Interpretive Dancer Suzanne Muldowney, Jason Spirit the Birdman of Brooklyn, Rossabella Thornbloom, Yumpin' Yetter, Wild Orchid

40) Edd Hall, The Well-Balanced Michael Jarosz, Richard Bush and His Stomach of Steel, Heather Zigzag Marell, Jokin' John Mobilio, Marchitelli's March, Souls

41) Nicole Sullivan, New Age Mime Jerome "Laser Face" Benton, Mr. Phil, Mike Sock it to Me Alltmont, Nasal Linguist Jeff Jones, Meowin' Monica and Pumpkin, Space

42) Nadia Dajani, Derrick Nowlin's Palms of Steel, Bingo Gazingo & The 8th Grade, Scott & Ray the Motion Explosion, Gypsy's Funky Fingers, Gabriel's Forget-Me-Knots, BIS

43) Kathy Griffin, Double Dutch Divas, Jeff Bartlett's Nervy Nostrils, Stanless Steel, Tony Oh My Goth Sarinopoulos, In-Fantastic Carmen & Nisida Spera, Blink 182

44) Hill Harper, Valerie Galloway & Richie, Cinder-Fellas Jose & Arturo, Roland Moussa's UFO Toy, The Cross-eyed Fourniers, Our Lady Peace

45) Engelbert Humperdinck, Neptune & Bubbles, Barry the Human Cherry Tree, The Allure of Kerima, Stuart Rudin's Reptilian Rap, Crybaby Jeanine Moss, Cool for August

46) Connie Britton, Jumpin & Hoppin & Climbin with Alex n Lazer, Mr. Hand Man, The New Fangled Sebastian Todd, Tongue-tied Jim, Major William Best, The Supertones

47) Guillermo Diaz, Pedalectric Libor Karas, The Clockworks Experimental Puppetry Theatre, Joe's Multiplication Madness, Lady Betty Aberlin, Alice Tzou and Her Pipa, Jimmie's Chicken Shack

48) Scott Thompson, Jumpin Mark Odgers, Ron Valdes' Chain Reaction, Yuma and The Culture Exchange, Musique de Dominique, Lyons' Roar, The Honeyrods

49) Sam Sarpong, Yo-Yo Master John Freeborn, Stanless Steel, Samba Cumina Samba, Shay Magnifique, Descendents

50) Denise Austin, The Fishy Antonio DaSliva, Kathleen's Amazing Buttocks, Alan Hotfoot Gabay, Bradford Reed and His Pencilina, Treble Charger

51) Todd Barry, Hip Pickles, Cinder-fellas Jose & Arturo, Fortune Fun with Kate, Tom Tricky Pinky Lally, Radish

52) Matt Malloy, Human Place Setting Scott Baker, Catherine and her Broomstick, The Wizard of Vase, Larry's Bicuspid Beat, Travis Pyro Puss Goldstein, Local H

53) White House Wonders Nick & Joe, Toolin' Around with Natalia Paruz, Dean Street Field of Operation, Crackin' Up with Adam Rothman, Cubist Abe Mittleman, Sarwar Khan, Camp Lo

54) WCW's Public Enemy, The Belly Boys, Mighty Mike Lane, Tarik's Moroccan Magic, The Leg-endary Dan & Noa, The Eye-popping Max Kuperman, The Dambuilders

55) Nancy Giles, Stanless Steel, Instant Artist Morris Katz, Shock-a-Lock, Sarah's Mannequinetics, The Inflatable Chelsea Thompson, ManBREAK

56) Louis C.K., The Barber of Oddville, Ken's Unique Physique, Steinfeld, Human Corkscrew Dennis Parente, Countess Kelly Jordan, FAT

57) WWF's Sunny, Scott's Prophylactic Proboscis, The Human Shopping Cart, Mike's Canine Canopy, The Un-Bubble-lievable Thomas Bresadora, Smash Mouth

58) Janet Gunn, Goin' Bananas with Marty, Barflies Jose & Arturo, Steady Rob Steen, Joe Papa, Aaron O'Lantern, Del Amitri

59) Devon Sawa, Arnold's Monstrous Makeover, The Multi-talented Dougie Rosenkrantz, Cha Cha King & Queen Sparky & Fae, Dr. Stanley Taub & Lois, Terror-ific April Richardson, Morphine

60) Weird Al Yankovic, Mike The Muncher DeVito, Tiny Yarborough, Grass Man Adam Mauksch, Yelena's Dance Fever, Dan's Lively Lips, Gus Gus

61) Leon, The Seasoned Swingers, Wrasslin' Nassim Ajami, Sasha's Sax Appeal, The Jaw-dropping Penny DiMarco, Heart to Heart with James, Fountains of Wayne

62) Randy & Jason Sklar, The Incredible Likeness of Baker, Maat, Weldon's Cheep Thrills, Cutlery Cut-Up Brian McDonald, Nipple Tricks with Joe & Eric, Camus

63) Chris & Peter Ferraro, Anthony's Feet of Steel, Hip-Hoop-Hooray with Tatiana, The Twisted Michael Malavarca, Miss Tammy Sue Buser, Jenna and her Motor Tongue, Cowboy Mouth

64) Anthony Barrile, Bouncy Ella & Inna & Regina, Nigerian Poetess Ayodele, Funky Phil and his Friend Larry, The Comic Stylings of Gary Allen, Kristina's Musical Throat, Guided by Voices

65) Dominique Dawes, Roger's Mini Masterpieces, Human Trumpet Glen Miller, Serene, Arthur Glass Kicker, Bettie Serveert

66) A Very Oddville Wedding with Michael Boatman, Phil Dejean and Cinnamon, Freddie Sez Schuman, Suzanne Muldowney, Izzy Fertel, Scott Baker, Daniel Lipper, Ripplin Rob Aloi, Burpmaster Ryan McCormick, Natalia Paruz, Bruce Gaston, Rigid Reiko, Eva Veronica Klein, Teenage Fan Club

References

External links

1990s American late-night television series
1990s American variety television series
1997 American television series debuts
1999 American television series endings
American television shows featuring puppetry
English-language television shows
MTV original programming